Enciéndelo is the first full-length album released by Mexican rock band, Coda. It was released in 1993.

Track listing
 "Atrevete" - 3:45 
 "Caminando En El Fuego" - 3:50 
 "Sin Tí No Se Continuar" - 3:54 
 "Viviendo De Noche" - 3:28 
 "Atado a Tu Piel" - 3:27 
 "Vivo o Muerto" - 3:45 
 "Boby" - 4:07 
 "Eternamente" - 4:57 
 "Preso De La Inquietud" - 4:19 
 "Tócame" - 3:57 
 "Pamela" - 3:52 
 "Hielo En Las Rosas" - 5:23

Personnel
 Salvador Aguilar - lead vocals
 Toño Ruiz - guitars
 Chucho Esquivel - drums
 Allan Pérez - bass
 David Melchor - keyboards

References

Album Info at Heavy Harmonies.

1993 albums
Coda (band) albums